Shine is the fourth solo studio album from Trey Anastasio, and his first release since the breakup of Phish in August 2004. Included in this release is new material written by Anastasio in late 2004 and early '05. The album also marks the first release by Anastasio apart from Elektra Records, as he has signed on with Columbia Records for this album. Shine was released on November 1, 2005, and was followed by a nationwide tour beginning in Minneapolis and ending in Los Angeles. It was also released in the DualDisc format.

The title track was Anastasio's most successful solo single on the Billboard Adult Alternative Songs chart, reaching #4 in December 2005.

Track listing
"Shine" (Trey Anastasio, Brendan O'Brien) - 3:08
"Tuesday" (Anastasio) - 3:43
"Invisible" (Anastasio, O'Brien) - 3:53
"Come as Melody" (Anastasio) - 4:28
"Air Said to Me" (Anastasio) - 3:50
"Wherever You Find It" (Anastasio, O'Brien) - 5:54
"Sweet Dreams Melinda" (Anastasio, Lawton, Markellis) - 3:36
"Love Is Freedom" (Anastasio) - 3:55
"Sleep Again" (Anastasio, O'Brien) - 5:01
"Spin" (Anastasio, O'Brien) - 4:52
"Black" (Anastasio) - 4:32
"Love That Breaks All Lines" (Anastasio) - 3:50

Personnel
Drums - Kenny Aronoff
Bass guitar, keyboards, drums, backing vocals - Brendan O'Brien
Percussion - Cyro Baptista
Bass guitar - Peter Chwazik
Keyboards - Karl Egsieker, Ray Paczkowski

Extended copy protection
The CD was originally released with Extended Copy Protection, a rootkit based form of copy protection by Sony BMG, who owns Columbia Records, ironic given Phish's lax views on filesharing and concert taping.

After the Sony BMG CD copy prevention scandal, the album was reissued without the copy protection software.

References

External links
Trey Anastasio's Official Website
Phish's Official Website

2005 albums
Trey Anastasio albums
Albums produced by Brendan O'Brien (record producer)
Columbia Records albums